"Deep Silent Complete" is the fifth single by Finnish symphonic metal band Nightwish, released as the only official single from their third studio album, Wishmaster. The song contains lines written by William Shakespeare, and was dedicated to the ocean.

It reached number three on the Finland singles chart, and was certified with Gold Disc in Finland with more than 5,000 sold copies.

Track listing
All tracks are written by Tuomas Holopainen.

 "Deep Silent Complete" – 3:57
 "Sleepwalker" (heavy version) – 3:10

Personnel
Tarja Turunen – vocals
Tuomas Holopainen – keyboards
Emppu Vuorinen – guitars
Jukka Nevalainen – drums
Sami Vänskä – bass guitar

References

External links
Nightwish's Official Website 

Nightwish songs
2000 singles
Number-one singles in Finland
Songs written by Tuomas Holopainen
2000 songs
Spinefarm Records singles